Fregetta is a seabird genus in the austral storm petrel family Oceanitidae.

Taxonomy
The genus Fregetta was introduced in 1855 by the French naturalist Charles Lucien Bonaparte. He specified the type species as Thalasssidroma leucogaster  which is now considered as a subspecies of the white-bellied storm petrel.

The genus contains four species:
 White-bellied storm petrel, Fregetta grallaria
 Black-bellied storm petrel, Fregetta tropica
 New Zealand storm petrel, Fregetta maoriana – formerly placed in Oceanites
 New Caledonian storm petrel, Fregetta lineata – revived as a distinct species in 2022

References

 
Bird genera
Taxa named by Charles Lucien Bonaparte
Taxonomy articles created by Polbot